Świercze may refer to:
Świercze, Lublin Voivodeship (east Poland)
Świercze, Pułtusk County in Masovian Voivodeship (east-central Poland)
Gmina Świercze, Pułtusk County
Świercze, Siedlce County in Masovian Voivodeship (east-central Poland)
Świercze, Opole Voivodeship (south-west Poland)
 Swiercze Commune

See also
Świerże (disambiguation)